Bni Hadifa or Aït Hdifa is a town in Al Hoceïma Province, Tanger-Tetouan-Al Hoceima, Morocco. According to the 2004 census it has a population of 2061.

References

Populated places in Al Hoceïma Province
Rural communes of Tanger-Tetouan-Al Hoceima